The Uttar Pradesh Expressways Industrial Development Authority (UPEIDA) is an authority set up in 2007 by the Government of Uttar Pradesh to develop expressway projects in the state. The headquarters of UPEIDA is located at Paryatan Bhawan in Gomti Nagar, Lucknow.

Projects 

The authority is set up to develop the following expressway projects:

Operational 
 Agra–Lucknow Expressway
 Purvanchal Expressway
 Bundelkhand Expressway

Under-construction 
 Gorakhpur Link Expressway
 Ganga Expressway

Proposed Plan 
 Greater Noida-Baliia Expressway
 Sanauta Bridge(Bulandshahr)-Purkazi(Muzaffarnagar) Expressway
 Bijnor-Moradabad-Fatehgarh Expressway
 Agra-Kanpur Expressway
 Jhansi-Kanpur-Lucknow-Gorakhpur-Kushinagar Expressway
 Lucknow-Barabanki-Nanpara Expressway

References

External links 
 Official Website

Expressways in Uttar Pradesh
State agencies of Uttar Pradesh
Proposed road infrastructure in India
Transport organisations based in India
State industrial development corporations of India
Government agencies with year of establishment missing